Deke Sharon (born December 12, 1967) is an American singer, arranger, composer, director, producer and teacher of a cappella music, and is one of the leaders and promoters of the contemporary a cappella community. He has been referred to as "the father of contemporary a cappella" by some authors, and "the godfather of a cappella" by others.

Early life
Deke Sharon was born and raised in San Francisco. He started singing in choir groups at age five, including the San Francisco Boys Chorus. He attended Town School for Boys and San Francisco University High School, where he sang  lead (second tenor) in the barbershop quartet his freshman year in "The Music Man," and kept it going all four years, learning to direct and arrange a cappella.

College
Sharon spent his college years in Boston, graduating from Tufts University with a degree in childhood studies, and a degree from the New England Conservatory of Music with a focus on vocal jazz, third stream (now called "contemporary improvisation"), and music theory.

In college, he directed the collegiate a cappella group the Tufts Beelzebubs, transforming the group's sound to reflect modern rock, with intricate instrumental vocalizations and the integration of vocal percussion. The 1990–1991 Beelzebubs album Foster Street that he directed musically is credited with the creation of contemporary a cappella sound. Sharon had to audition three times before he was accepted, as he was seen as "overzealous" during a time when a cappella was not popular, a fact which was mentioned in the book "Pitch Perfect." Beca and Benji in the Pitch Perfect films are partially based on Sharon. During this time, he decided to make a career of contemporary a cappella.

Film

Sharon was the music director and arranger for the film Pitch Perfect, as well as singing on several of the songs, where he was credited on screen as "Male Voice #1." He returned for Pitch Perfect 2, in which he has a brief cameo as the German judge and broadcaster. He helped involve several professional a cappella groups and singers with the film, including The Filharmonic, Penn Masala, and Pentatonix. Sharon also worked with the Green Bay Packers. He returned to music-direct, arrange, and vocally produce for Pitch Perfect 3. He had also arranged for the film, The Social Network.

Television
In December 2009, he acted as music director, arranger, coach, and consultant behind the scenes on America's first a cappella reality show competition, titled The Sing-Off, and returned in 2010 as one of the show's producers. He also served as Executive Music Producer on the Dutch Sing Off, Sing Off South Africa and Sing-Off China, including several guest appearances as a judge and performer.

Along with The House Jacks, he sang and performed the 2011 Monday Night Football theme song "Are You Ready for Some Football" with Hank Williams, Jr.

He worked with Straight No Chaser on their first PBS special Live in New York.

He appeared in front of the camera for the first time on Lifetime's Pitch Slapped reality show, in which he coached after school high school a cappella group Stay Tuned from Cherry Hill, New Jersey, focusing both on their musicality and emotional delivery. The show also aired overseas in London, Israel (where its name in Hebrew means "a cappella battle") across Latin America, Indonesia and the Philippines (under the name Pitch Battle).

As of summer 2017 he is series music director for a new competitive choir show on BBC1 called Pitch Battle, as well as appearing on camera each episode providing insight and commentary. He was also the third judge for the season one live finale.

He judged Eurovision Choir 2019. In 2022 music directed "Best in Snow" for Disney+ as well as co-arranged/vocal produced the a cappella scenes in Pitch_Perfect:_Bumper_in_Berlin.

Performing career
Upon graduation in 1991, he moved back to San Francisco, bringing with him a handful of other collegiate a cappella singers to form The House Jacks, a pioneering a cappella group known for its original music and sound, often called "the original rock band without instruments", in part because they were the first a cappella group with a designated vocal percussionist.

The House Jacks have released seven albums (signed to Warner Brothers/Tommy Boy Records in the mid-1990s) and completed several world tours. He has performed with many musicians, including Ray Charles, Crosby, Stills and Nash and James Brown. They have won "Best Pop Rock Album" from the Contemporary A Cappella Society, for "Unbroken" (2004), "Level" (2010), and "Pollen (2014).

He also performs as a solo artist, with groups such as the San Francisco Gay Men's Chorus and at events like Singapore's "Vocal Edge" and directing DCINY's annual "Total Vocal" at Carnegie Hall as well as serving as Emcee for a cappella events, such as the annual Techapella concerts in the San Francisco Bay Area.

Studio session credits include the Wii game Just Dance Kids 2 including the songs "The Lion Sleeps Tonight", "Barbara Ann", and "Mahna Mahna".

Arranging
A prolific, award-winning vocal music arranger, he has arranged more than 2,000 songs for a wide range of ensembles, including some of vocal music's best-known groups. The Best Arrangement award at the Colorado Harmony Sweepstakes is named after him, and he has won the best arrangement award at the Harmony Sweepstakes several times since 1991. He was named "favorite arranger" in the 2010 A Cappella Community Awards and won "Best Professional Arrangement" in 2019.

Live music direction and production
He founded and directed a cappella groups at Walt Disney World/Epcot (American Vybe) and Disneyland (Groove 66). In 2013, he created a new professional a cappella ensemble in New Mexico: "Voasis". In 2014 and 2015 he music-directed the Sing Off Live tour He created Vocalosity for which he was artistic producer, music director, and arranger. They started touring in 2016 and their debut album was released on Universal Classics.

In December 2017 he announced the formation of DCappella, a seven-member contemporary a cappella group launched in 2018 that will tour performing arts centers singing music from classic and contemporary Disney films. He serves as the group's co-creator, music director, arranger, album producer and artistic producer  integrating modern sounds and technology.

His production with Columbia Artists Management, "A Cappella Live," toured the US featuring four a cappella acts: Committed (vocal group), The Filharmonic, Women of the World, and Blake Lewis.

Album production
As a producer of a cappella recordings, he is known for having changed the sound of collegiate a cappella recording via the Beelzebubs' album Code Red. He has arranged and produced multiple albums and tracks for Atlantic Records' Straight No Chaser, including the certified gold "Christmas Cheers".

In the early 1990s, he co-founded The Best of College A Cappella (BOCA) compilation, which he now produces annually with Varsity Vocals.

Event production and promotion
In college, he brought the Harmony Sweepstakes A Cappella Festival to the East Coast, producing the first Boston regional with the Beelzebubs. Shortly after college he founded the International Championship of Collegiate A Cappella (ICCA), the West and East Coast A Cappella Summits (the first contemporary a cappella conferences), and a number of other a cappella-related projects, programs, and events with the goal of popularizing a cappella. Recent festivals include Aca-West in San Francisco and VoiceJam in Arkansas where he often hosts the evening concert or competition as well as teach during the day.

He is a frequent host and emcee at a cappella events, such as Silicon Valley's "Techapella", The National A Cappella Convention, The annual College Notes event in Walnut Creek CA, "Pacific Harmony" in New Zealand, AKA A Cappella in Singapore, and the Maui Barbershop Festival. Some of the videos he has posted to promote a cappella groups around the world have gone viral. He's also frequently in residency or headlining events at universities such as Indiana U, Midland U and Tufts U  and judged the 2021 World Choir Games in Antwerp.

His work to popularize and promote a cappella worldwide is now being recognized by major media: "A Capella [sic] is more popular than ever, thanks to this guy" (NPR Here and Now), "Deke Sharon makes a cappella cool again" (NPR All Things Considered).

Organizations
In his college dorm he founded The Contemporary A Cappella Society and The Ultimate A Cappella Arranging Service (which became TotalVocal). Shortly after graduation, he created the Contemporary A Cappella Recording Awards ("CARAs"), a cappella's equivalent of the Grammy Awards.

He formed the Contemporary A Cappella League, a new national network of adult "post-collegiate" a cappella groups.

Writing
 A Cappella Arranging, his first book, co-authored with Dylan Bell, was published in 2012.
 A Cappella, a general interest book covering many aspects of the style, co-authored with Ben Spalding and Brody McDonald, was released in 2015.
 The Heart of Vocal Harmony, about how vocal harmony groups can perform with unified emotion, was released in early 2016.
 A Cappella Warmups for Pop and Jazz Choirs and
 So You Want To Sing A Cappella were both released in 2017.
 Teaching Music Through Performance in Contemporary A Cappella, the first contemporary a cappella repertoire guide, was released summer 2020 

Biographical Information about Deke Sharon can be found in Mickey Rapkin's Pitch Perfect (2008), Rick Smolan's 24 Hours in Cyberspace (1996), Joshua Duchan's Powerful Voices (2012), Alysia Abbott's Fairyland (2013) and Carsten Gerlitz's Popchor (2018)

Musical theater

The pioneering, first all-a cappella musical on Broadway, In Transit, for which he is co-producer and arranged all the music, opened at the Circle in the Square Theater on Broadway in December 2016. He started working with the production just after their off-Broadway run five years earlier.

Vocalosity, a live a cappella theatrical concert production with diverse cast, began touring in January 2016 and has performed in 30 states.

He has worked on a cappella musical theatre projects including "Street" and "Our World".

He arranged the opening number for Andrew Lloyd Webber's new greatest hits musical "Unmasked", a fast-paced mashup of 17 of his greatest hits.

Education
He co-founded and directs Camp Acappella for teens and adults each summer at Wright State University in Dayton, Ohio and teaches the music production class Soup To Nuts periodically. as well as travels to other countries to work with groups in person, such as New Zealand, Brazil, Italy, Sri Lanka and Singapore.

His YouTube channel features a variety of educational topics including how to sound like several different instruments. A GE special features him discussing the physics of a cappella.

In 2016, he joined the California branch of the American Choral Directors Association as the first ever Contemporary A Cappella R&R chair. and co-created Acappella.how for google  His Camp A Cappella Intensive in Washington DC started in 2022, a partnership with Ben Folds, Planet Word, and the National Symphony Orchestra.

Awards
The Pitch Perfect soundtrack earned several awards, including an RIAA platinum record certification, the American Music Award for best soundtrack, an Online Film and Television Association nomination for Best Music, Adapted Song (Don't You Forget About Me) and an MTV Video Music Award for "Best Musical Moment".

The Pitch Perfect 2 soundtrack, which debuted at No. 1 on the Billboard 200, secured the American Music Award for best Soundtrack and a Grammy nomination for Best Soundtrack.

As album producer, he was nominated for a Dove Award in 2012 (Best Contemporary Gospel Album: Committed).

In 2016, he became an honorary member of the Barbershop Harmony Society, one of only twenty since 1938, and he was named an honorary member of BYU Vocal Point. In 2017 he was awarded the P.T. Barnum Award for excellence in Entertainment from his alma mater, Tufts University.

He has received two lifetime achievement awards for his work in a cappella: in 2016 for the 25th anniversary of his founding of thee Contemporary A Cappella Society and in 2018, from the A Cappella Music Awards.

Other
He is known for his ability to replicate a variety of instruments (e.g. trumpet, guitar, flute, violin, muted trumpet, harmonica) with his voice—which he teaches online and via "Singing Instruments" seminars—teaching summer camp for young vocalists, and adjudicating choral festivals around the world. He has worked with many professional pop vocal groups, including 98 Degrees, The Nylons and Boyz II Men.

Helping groups get started has been a ongoing goal of his for 30 years, which he does by providing free advice, support  and arrangements. He also works with organizations philanthropically who support vocal harmony.

He served on the CASA board for almost twenty years, often as President or Vice President. Acapellablog named him the number-one "a cappella power player to keep an eye on in 2012", and NPR credits him for "making a cappella cool again".

In 2016 he launched an a cappella podcast called "Counterpoint" with co-host Robert Dietz  and has appeared on other podcasts.

To help promote Good Omens, he arranged several songs for "The Chattering Order of St Beryl," a group of singing nuns., and co-created  Walmart's "Sparkappella."

When the cult NXIVM tried to use a cappella as a recruiting device, he drew out Keith Raniere in a public forum, resulting in his being put on their list of enemies.

He has been featured repeatedly in Kiplinger's Personal Finance for socially responsible investing.

He describes his life's work is "to get more people singing" because "music can build a better community" as "our country needs to understand the importance of working together". His motto is "Harmony through harmony."

Selected bibliography

Selected discography

See also
A cappella
Collegiate a cappella
Contemporary A Cappella Society

References

Sources
 Marine, Craig. (June 24, 1992) San Francisco Examiner "Home of some very brave singers at the coliseum, A's anthem contest brings out talented and otherwise." Section: News; Page A5.
 Carnes, Jim. (May 21, 1993) The Sacramento Bee "Jacks of all vocal trades." Section: Ticket; Page 15.
 Scott, Jane. (October 19, 1993) The Plain Dealer (Cleveland, Ohio) "Jacking up music with edgy a cappella." Section: Arts & Living; Page C14.
 Birmingham News (October 7, 1994) Crime reports. Section: News; Page 2.
 Winn, Steven. (March 6, 1996) San Francisco Chronicle "'Media' to reopen stage door." Section: Daily Datebook; Page E1.
 Eichenwald, Kurt. (June 22, 1997) The New York Times "Pop/jazz; 'Doo-Wop-a-Doo' will no longer do." Section 2; Page 232.
 Eichenwald, Kurt. (July 17, 1997) Albany Times Union "A cappella groups push vocal limits." Section: Preview; Page 6.
 Associated Press (December 8, 1997) "A Cappella Renaissance." Section: Entertainment.
 Roberts, Alison. (February 4, 1999) The Sacramento Bee "Mouthin' to it: Boyz nite out takes the a cappella approach to rock 'n' roll." Section: Scene; Page F1.
 Muther, Christopher. (February 21, 1999) The Boston Globe "Different sounds of music group aims to make its mark in a cappella." Section: City Weekly; Page 9.
 Sharon, Deke. (August 2, 2000) San Francisco Examiner "Letters to the editor." Section: News.
 PR Newswire (October 10, 2000) "Internet Radio Is Home for the Adventurous, May Force Traditional Radio to Change Its Tune Says Expert."
 Alexander, Sandy. (February 25, 2001) The Baltimore Sun "Campuses in tune with singers Music: The voices-only sound of a cappella groups catches on at colleges in Maryland and across the nation." Section: Special Tab; Page 1S.
 Alarik, Scott. (April 22, 2001) The Boston Globe "'B-doom doom doom' they're not your father's a cappella." Section: Northwest weekly; Page 11.
 Burrell, Jackie. (March 4, 2006) Contra Costa Times "Old style, new sounds." Section: Local; Page F4.
 Gomeztagle, Frances. (December 14, 2006) Colorado Springs Independent "Sound effects." Volume 14; Issue 50; Page 28.
 McCandish, Laura. (May 19, 2007) The Baltimore Sun "Harmonizing the Melting Pot". Section: Local; Page B1.
 Terauds, John. (January 27, 2008) Toronto Star "Acappellooza Shows A Cappella Singing on the Rise". Section: Entertainment.
 Rapkin, Mickey. (March 23, 2008) The New York Times "Perfect Tone, in a Key That's Mostly Minor". Section: Style.
 Scott Simon. (May 31, 2008) Weekend Edition "Perfect Pitch: The Drama of Collegiate A Cappella".
 Rapkin, Mickey. Pitch Perfect: The Quest for Collegiate A Cappella Glory. Gotham Books, 2008.
 Edgers, Geoff. (May 15, 2011) The Boston Globe "Voices Carry" Section: Arts and Entertainment.

External links
dekesharon.com

Deke Sharon vocal arrangements
IBDB
Counterpoint Podcast
Reddit AMA
"Making Choruses Cooler" (Chorus America)
Verge: "How the man behind "Pitch Perfect's music built an a cappella empire"
The New York Times: "From 'Pitch Perfect' to Broadway, He's Vocal About A Cappella"
Insider: "How 'Pitch Perfect' overcame a tiny budget and an a cappella 'boot camp' that left most of the cast in tears to become a comedy classic"

A cappella
1967 births
Living people
Composers from San Francisco
Tufts University School of Arts and Sciences alumni
American male singers
American rock singers
American music arrangers
Singers from San Francisco
New England Conservatory alumni
The House Jacks members